Thomas or Tom Rodgers may refer to:

Thomas S. Rodgers (1858–1931), US Navy officer in the Spanish–American War 
Thomas A. Rodgers (died 1821), Secretary of State of Alabama
Thomas Rodgers (born 1979), heir apparent of the Rodgers baronets
Tom Rodgers (born 1960), advocate for Native Americans and tribal issues
Tom Rodgers (mountain bike racer) (died 2009)
Thomas Malin Rodgers (1943–2012), founder of Gathering for Gardner

See also
Thomas Rogers (disambiguation)
Thomas Rodger (1832–1883), Scottish photographer